Dulla Vaily is a 2018 Punjabi-language film directed by Devi Sharma. It stars Gurvar Cheema, Aakanksha Sareen, Yograj Singh, Gaggu Gill and Sarbjit Cheema.

Plot 
A corrupt landowner terrorizes the local villagers, when a man decides to stand up for them all.

Cast 
Gurvar Cheema
Aakanksha Sareen
Yograj Singh
Gaggu Gill
Sarbjit Cheema
Neet Mahal
Muhmmad Sadiq
Gugni Gill

References

External links 
 

2018 films
Punjabi-language Indian films
2010s Punjabi-language films